Worth County was a Texas county which was established by the state legislature from territory previously belonging to Santa Fe County, Texas on January 3, 1850. Val Verde (later the site of the Civil War Battle of Valverde) was established as the county seat.

Worth County was never actually organized as the territory (in large part due to local opposition of the area being considered a part of Texas) and was ceded a few months later to the US Federal government on November 25, 1850, as a part of the Compromise of 1850.

See also 

 List of defunct counties in Texas

References

External links 
 1849 De Cordova Map of the State of Texas from Wikimedia Commons

Texas counties
Former counties of Texas